Choi Jae-woo (born 27 February 1994) is a South Korean freestyle skier. He competed at the 2014 Winter Olympics.

References 

South Korean male freestyle skiers
Freestyle skiers at the 2014 Winter Olympics
Freestyle skiers at the 2018 Winter Olympics
Olympic freestyle skiers of South Korea
Living people
1994 births
Asian Games medalists in freestyle skiing
Freestyle skiers at the 2011 Asian Winter Games
Freestyle skiers at the 2017 Asian Winter Games
Asian Games silver medalists for South Korea
Medalists at the 2017 Asian Winter Games
20th-century South Korean people
21st-century South Korean people